Charles School Blakely (November 6, 1880 – January 11, 1975) was an American army officer and brigadier general who served during World War I.

Early life 
Blakely was born in Philadelphia on November 6, 1880. In 1904, he graduated 29th of 124 from the United States Military Academy. Blakely's older brother, George Blakely, was also a graduate of the United States Military Academy, and a U.S. general.

Career 
Blakely was an artilleryman, and was promoted to brigadier general on October 1, 1918, commanding an artillery brigade in France. After this, he was the commanding general of the brigade fire center. From 1922 to 1925, he was executive officer for the Chief of Field Artillery in Washington. During 1926 and 1927, he studied at the Naval War College in Newport, Rhode Island. From 1934 to 1937, Blakely was assistant commandant of the Field Artillery School at Fort Sill, Oklahoma. In 1938, after thirty-four years of service, he retired due to disabilities.

Death and legacy 
Charles School Blakely died at his home in Louisville, Kentucky at the age of ninety-four on January 11, 1975.

References 

1880 births
1975 deaths
United States Army generals
United States Military Academy alumni
United States Army generals of World War I